Mogorella, Mogoredda in sardinian language, is a comune (municipality) in the Province of Oristano in the Italian region Sardinia, located about  northwest of Cagliari and about  east of Oristano.

Mogorella borders the following municipalities: Albagiara, Ruinas, Usellus, Villa Sant'Antonio, Villaurbana.

References

External links

 Official website

Cities and towns in Sardinia